Inauguration of William McKinley may refer to: 

First inauguration of William McKinley, 1897
Second inauguration of William McKinley, 1901

See also